Platerów  is a village in Łosice County, Masovian Voivodeship, in east-central Poland. It is the seat of the gmina (administrative district) called Gmina Platerów.

The village has a population of 812.

References

Villages in Łosice County